Rimma Ivanovna Bilunova (née Kazmina; August 21, 1940 – December 21, 2015) was a Russian chess player who was awarded the FIDE title of Woman International Master (WIM) in 1968, head coach of USSR's women's national team (1983-1988) and Honored coach of the RSFSR. She was twice women's champion of the RSFSR (1966 and 1968) and of the Armed Forces of the USSR (1966 and 1968).

Family 
 Father –  Ivan Kazmin, he worked in the Ministry of Agriculture of the USSR
 Husband  –  Boris Bilunov, historian and chess player 
 Son –  Denis

References

External links
 Rimma I Bilunova chess games at 365chess.com
 
  ChessPro Interview with Rimma Bilunova. ChessPro.

1940 births
2015 deaths
Chess Woman International Masters
South Ural State University alumni
Soviet female chess players
Russian female chess players
Sportspeople from Kurgan Oblast